Culture is both the conventional conduct and ideologies of a given community. 

Culture may also refer to:

Science
 Microbiological culture
 Microbial food cultures
 Animal culture, socially-transmitted and learned traditions in animals

Social sciences
 Organizational culture, also known as corporate culture, in management
 The Cultural Creatives, a 2000 theorized Western subculture
 Cultural Revolution, a period of widespread social and political upheaval in China
 Archaeological culture, in archaeology, a term attributed to human activity and also to a consistently recurring assemblage

Entertainment and fiction

Literature
 Culture Magazine, an American cannabis culture magazine
 Culture series, a science fiction series written by Scottish author Iain M. Banks
 The Culture, an advanced civilization in the Banks novels

Music
 Culture (band), a Jamaican reggae group
 Culture (musician), a Canadian rapper
 Culture Club, an English band
 Culture Press, a UK record label
 Culture (album), a 2017 album by Migos

Other
 "Culture" (Bottom), an episode of the British sitcom Bottom
 Kultur (film), a 1918 American silent film directed by Edward J. Le Sainte

Other
 IETF language tags, used in computer internationalization and localization to identify a "culture" - the combination of language and peculiarities of geographical location in computing (like en-UK, en-US, de-AT, de-DE, fr-BE)
 Cultures, Lozère, a commune in France

See also
 Cross Culture (disambiguation)
 Counter Culture (disambiguation)
 Couture (disambiguation) 
 Cult (disambiguation)